Aerial roof markings are symbols, letters or numbers on the roof of selected police vehicles, fire engines, ambulances, coast guard vehicles, cash-in-transit vans, buses and boats to enable aircraft or CCTV to identify them. These markings can be used to identify a specific vehicle, vehicle type or agency. The markings, depending on the vehicle, or information required, may also be displayed on the bonnet, boot, or other areas of the vehicle visible from the air.

Australia 

Different state police forces in Australia use different aerial roof markings to designate specific vehicles, duty types and areas.

New South Wales Police Force 
 
Local Area Commands vehicle bonnet/roof codes

Specialist squads/units and groups vehicle bonnet/roof codes

Fire appliances in New South Wales 

Fire and Rescue NSW fit aerial identification markings to appliances that are indicative of the vehicles call sign. Example: "RP001" indicates the appliance is the Rescue Pumper belonging to station 001, the City of Sydney, while HH077 indicates the Heavy Hazmat support truck from St Marys fire station.

Fire and Rescue NSW aerial roof ID codes

The New South Wales Rural Fire Service fits aerial identification numbers to rural fire appliances with the format consisting of the letter "B" (for Bush Fire) and the last 4 digits of the vehicles RTA approved operations plate. Example: "BF-07967" allocates an aerial ID of "7967". These markings do not denote a vehicles callsign.

The South Australian Country Fire Service have an infrared beacon on the roof of most new appliances and the vehicle call sign. As all trucks are named and numbered according to their location, capacity and capability (e.g. Hynam 34, Location: Hynam, 3000L, 4WD or Belair 34P, Location Belair, 3000L, 4WD, Pumper), their call sign is also placed on the roof of the cab in a red text on white roof fashion. Older State Emergency Service vehicles, primarily in country areas, may have their call sign on the roof as well.

United Kingdom

Police vehicles 

Police vehicles in the United Kingdom have markings of symbols, letters and numbers on their tops to enable aircraft to identify them.  These markings show the use of the vehicle, its force code and a vehicle identifying mark or the police division to which the vehicle belongs.

Not every vehicle displays markings, but those involved in response and traffic generally do.  This factor stems from guidelines of the Association of Chief Police Officers relating to police air operations and pursuit management.

Vehicle usage markings 
 Armed response vehicle (ARV) used by armed police from various police units – five-point star ★
 General (incident response vehicle or area car)/Traffic – a circle symbol ●
 Dog support unit (DSU) – triangle ▲
 Public order (PO) personnel carrier – square ◼
Police medics. Some policing vehicles like ARVs and IRVs may have major first aid and fire equipment installed with trained officers aboard – green cross +

On a typical vehicle roof layout, the vehicle usage marking is preceded by an integer PNC Force Identifier; the individual (and within each organisation, unique) Vehicle Identifier, commonly alphanumeric, should occupy a second line all by itself.

Unique PNC force code 
The Police National Computer (PNC) is used by UK police forces and other government agencies to store and retrieve data about people, vehicles, plant and government locations. Regarding roof markings, their inscription helps identifying the regional or institutional affiliation of each vehicle. PNC force codes are also used when custody records are created, when items are submitted to places such as the Forensic Science Service laboratory, when evidence is stored, or when documents are to be passed from one force to another. They also form the first two digits of any certificate issued under the Firearms Act since the introduction of the National Firearms Licensing Management System. For example, a licence issued by the Metropolitan Police will start with '02'.

Thermal roof markings 
In 2004, the UK Home Office, under direction from the Technical and Training Committee of ACPO Air Operations were tasked with improving the recognition and identification of police vehicles amongst other traffic, particularly when operating at night. Colour images show the flashing blue lights but other details are lost, and a thermal camera image would show the vehicles and surroundings, but the livery and roofbar lighting could not be seen. The preferred solution was to make the police vehicle distinguishable when viewed with a thermal camera.

Working with QinetiQ, they developed a thermally reflective marking film and issued the publication "Thermal Roof Markings for Police Vehicles 43/04".

These markings reflect infra-red light back to the thermal imager, resulting in a contrast between the cold reflection and the ground / vehicle temperature. Being passive in nature, they require no activity on the part of the air observer or vehicle crew, nor any power from the vehicle.

Public buses 

Vehicles operating London Buses services carry roof markings, as shown in the image opposite. The first three letters denote the operator (ARL is Arriva London) and the remaining letters and numbers are the fleet number (VLW 92), which also appears on the front and rear of the vehicle.

Operator codes include:
ARL, Arriva London
GAG, Go-Ahead Group
MTG, Metroline
ABL, Abellio
SCG, Stagecoach Group
FRG, Tower Transit

Germany

Fire vehicles 
In Germany, DIN 14035, "Dachkennzeichen für Feuerwehrfahrzeuge" (Roof Marking of Fire Engines), issued in November 1981, defines that fire engines should carry their registration plate number; these include the one-to-three letter abbreviation code of the corresponding Landkreis, thus making regional origin self-evident. The inscription is recommended to be at least 40 cm in size; the font color should, in terms of roof painting, be "white on red", or "black on white and aluminium/metallic".

As DIN standards are, however, not generally binding in Germany, but mere recommendations, the scheme is not used everywhere, with some fire companies preferring visually appealing inscriptions like company name or logo. Many others show their cars' radio call signs (traditionally "Florian ##", cf. de:Funkrufname); over the years, various local efforts have been made to match both designations, aided by district administrations that reserved registered car like designations on principle.

European Union

Ambulances 
CEN 1789, "Medical vehicles and their equipment - Road ambulances", reissued in 2007, recommends in its "informative" annex A "Recognition", that roofs of ambulance vehicles should bear the Red Cross/Crescent Emblems or the Star of Life.

Canada 

Aerial roof markings are used by Toronto Police Service (# of cruiser) and Toronto EMS (Toronto EMS with region and number) to provide identification from the air. In the Metro Vancouver, British Columbia area, the various police forces have their specific municipal code and vehicle number on the roof for airborne identification.

References

External links 

Emergency vehicles
Vehicle markings